You Can Ride My Bike is a compilation album by Australian rock band Icecream Hands. It was released in 2004. The album was released as both a single disc—with all but one of the tracks taken from the band's first four albums—and a double disc containing b-sides and outtakes.

Track listing

Disc one
(All songs by Charles Jenkins except where noted)
 "The Way She Drives" — 1:55
 "The Ocean Floor" — 4:35
 "Home" — 3:18
 "Supermarket Scene" — 2:45
 "Winter's Tune" — 3:21
 "Paper Bird" — 3:10
 "Olive" — 2:39
 "Here We Go 'Round Now" — 3:57
 "Dodgy" (Charles Jenkins, Douglas Lee Robertson) — 2:44
 "Spirit Level Windowsill" — 2:27
 "Nipple" — 3:40
 "Yellow and Blue" (Robertson) — 2:32
 "Gasworks Park" — 5:18
 "Picture Disc From the Benelux" (Derek G. Smiley, Douglas Lee Robertson, Charles Jenkins) — 3:17
 "The Obvious Boy" — 3:26
 "Rain Hail Shine" — 3:44
 "Broken UFO" — 3:06
 "Beautiful Fields" — 3:15
 "Head Down" (Marcus Goodwin) — 3:33
 "Why'd You Have to Leave Me This Way?" — 3:27
 "When the Show is Over" (Robertson) — 4:06
 "Music by the Metre" — 4:05

Disc two
(All songs by Charles Jenkins)
 "Sanity Can" — 1:51
 "Riverside" — 2:49
 "Sobersides" — 3:03
 "Struggle Town" — 2:20
 "Bend" — 2:06
 "Early Morning Frost" — 4:24
 "Miller" — 2:40
 "Visiting Girl" — 3:18
 "Ed's General Store" — 2:56
 "It's Always Going to Get You" — 4:20
 "You Should Know By Now" — 3:20
 "I Bet It's Warm Up There" — 3:15
 "Three Minute Song" — 3:35
 "Letterbox" — 2:55
 "The Ballad of Human Nature" — 2:15
 "Can You Slide" — 3:00
 "Forest Hill" — 2:12
 "When The Bullshit Comes" — 2:45
 "Look At You Now" — 3:57
 "Sometimes" — 3:22
 "My Lights Are Green" — 3:31

Personnel

 Marcus Goodwin — guitar
 Charles Jenkins — guitar, vocals
 Douglas Lee Robertson — bass, vocals
 Derek G. Smiley — drums, vocals

References

2004 albums